Talara is a genus of moths in the subfamily Arctiinae.

Species
Talara albipars Hampson, 1914
Talara barema Schaus, 1896
Talara bombycia Schaus, 1896
Talara cinerea Hampson, 1900
Talara coccinea Butler, 1877
Talara ditis (Butler, 1878)
Talara grisea Schaus, 1896
Talara leucocera Druce, 1899
Talara megaspila Walker, 1866
Talara melanosticta Dyar, 1914
Talara mesospila Dyar, 1914
Talara minynthadia Dyar, 1914
Talara mona Dyar, 1914
Talara niveata (Butler, 1878)
Talara pelopia Druce, 1885
Talara phaeella Hampson, 1900
Talara rufa Schaus, 1899
Talara rufibasis (Felder, 1875)
Talara violescens Dyar, 1914

Check
Talara alborosea  Rothschild, 1913
Talara bicolor  Rothschild, 1913
Talara brunnescens  Rothschild, 1913
Talara cara  Schaus, 1911
Talara chionophaea  Hampson, 1914
Talara decepta  Schaus, 1905
Talara dilutior  Rothschild, 1913
Talara diversa  Schaus, 1905
Talara guyanae  Gibeaux, 1983
Talara hoffmanni  Reich, 1933
Talara ignibasis  Rothschild, 1913
Talara lepida  Schaus, 1911
Talara leucophaea  Dognin, 1912
Talara miniata  Rothschild, 1913
Talara muricolor  Gibeaux, 1983
Talara nigrivertex  Gibeaux, 1983
Talara nigroplagiata  Rothschild, 1913
Talara ornata  Schaus, 1905
Talara proxima  Gibeaux, 1983
Talara rubida  Schaus, 1911
Talara rugipennis  Schaus, 1905
Talara semiflava  Draudt, 1918
Talara simulatrix  Gibeaux, 1983
Talara subcoccinea  Schaus, 1905
Talara synnephela  Dyar, 1916
Talara thea  Schaus, 1924
Talara thiaucourti  Gibeaux, 1983
Talara togata  Draudt, 1918
Talara tristis  Gibeaux, 1983
Talara unimoda  Schaus, 1905
Talara violaceogriseus  Rothschild, 1913

References

Lithosiini
Moth genera